Pungitius is a genus of sticklebacks.

Species
There are currently ten recognized species in this genus:
 Pungitius bussei (Warpachowski, 1888)
 Pungitius hellenicus Stephanidis, 1971 (Ellinopygósteos)
 Pungitius laevis (G. Cuvier, 1829) (Smoothtail ninespined stickleback)
Pungitius modestus Matsumoto, Matsuura & Hanzawa, 2021
 Pungitius platygaster (Kessler, 1859) (Southern ninespined stickleback)
 Pungitius polyakovi S. V. Shedko, M. B. Shedko & Pietsch, 2005
 Pungitius pungitius (Linnaeus, 1758) (Ninespined stickleback)
 Pungitius sinensis (Guichenot, 1869) (Amur stickleback)
 Pungitius stenurus (Kessler, 1876)
 Pungitius tymensis (A. M. Nikolskii, 1889) (Sakhalin stickleback)

References 

 
Gasterosteidae
Taxonomy articles created by Polbot